The following is a list of the years, numbers, locations, moderators, and stated clerks of the General Assembly of the Orthodox Presbyterian Church, with report links included.

List of Moderators

Notable General Assemblies

1st General Assembly 
At the First General Assembly in Philadelphia, Pennsylvania in 1936, the Presbyterian Church of America (now the Orthodox Presbyterian Church) was established by conservative minister John Gresham Machen.

32nd General Assembly 
At the 32nd General Assembly of the Orthodox Presbyterian Church in Portland, Oregon, Mark O. Hatfield, the Governor of Oregon, offered welcome remarks.

References

Orthodox Presbyterian Church